Xiang Hengqing (Chinese: 相恒庆;15 July 1947 – 29 June 2015) was a Chinese footballer who played for China PR in the 1976 Asian Cup.

Playing career
Xiang Hengqing began football career in 1964, he has ever represented the Shandong youth football team and Shandong to participate in the Chinese league. Xiang Hengqing played for Shandong which won the championship of 1979 National Games of China. In 1976, Xiang Hengqing played for China PR in the 1976 Asian Cup.

Management career
Xiang Hengqing retired in 1981,he began to work as coach. Xiang Hengqing had ever worked as the coach of Shandong youth football team and Shandong.from 1992 to 1996,Xiang Hengqing worked as the vice chairman of Shandong province football association. From 1997 to 1998, Xiang Hengqing worked as the leader and coach of Shenzhen F.C. From 1999 to 2000, he worked as the coach of Yunnan Hongta F.C. In 2001, Xiang Hengqing worked as the coach of Shandong women's football team
and participate in 2005 National Games of China. In 2002, Xiang Hengqing worked as the coach of Shandong women's football team, and the same time he worked as the vice chairman of Shandong province football association.

Death
On June 29, 2015,  Xiang Hengqing died of lung cancer in Beijing, age 68.

References

External links
Team China Stats

1947 births
2015 deaths
Chinese footballers
1976 AFC Asian Cup players
China international footballers
Footballers from Qingdao
Asian Games bronze medalists for China
Asian Games medalists in football
Association football defenders
Footballers at the 1978 Asian Games
Medalists at the 1978 Asian Games
Shandong Taishan F.C. players
Shandong Taishan F.C. managers
Shenzhen F.C. managers